The 1938 Farnworth by-election was held on 27 January 1938.  The by-election was held due to the death of the incumbent Labour MP, Guy Rowson.  It was won by the Labour candidate George Tomlinson.

References

Farnworth
Farnworth
1930s in Lancashire
Farnworth 19389
Farnworth 1938
Farnworth 1938